Nquma rousi is a species of sea snail, a marine gastropod mollusk in the family Horaiclavidae.

Description
The length of the shell attains 17 mm.

The shell is broadly fusiform. The posterior two-fifths of the whorls between the sutures shows a strongly excavated channel. The anterior three-fifths are marked by 10–12 prominent, broad, low, rounded, somewhat protractive axial ribs which are truncated posteriorly by the channel, their terminations forming cusps. The intercostal spaces are about twice as wide as the ribs. The ribbed portions of the whorls on the spire are covered by five, equal and equally spaced, incised, spiral lines. The summit of the whorls are appressed, rendering the sutures ill-defined. The base of the body whorl is moderately long, marked by the feeble continuations of the axial ribs and on the posterior half by five incised spiral lines equaling those on the spire in strength and spacing and forming a continuous series with them. The anterior portion of the base shows about seven ill-defined spiral lirations. The aperture is narrowly elongate pyriform. The sinus is shallow immediately below the sutures. The outer lip is somewhat sinuous. The columella is strong, slightly sigmoid. The coloration of the type consists of a creamy white ground, which is almost unmarked in the subsutural channel and on the anterior half of the base on the last turn. A few dots of brownish orange appear near the summit between the ribs of the preceding whorls. The ribbed portion of the whorl between the anterior and posterior portion of the base is strongly mottled with brownish orange in the intercostal spaces, less so on the summits of the ribs, while a little posterior to the middle the base is marked by two slender spiral lines of the same color.

Distribution
This marine species occurs off Cape Agulhas to Southern KwaZulu-Natal, South Africa; also off Southern Madagascar.

References

 Steyn, D.G. & Lussi, M. (1998) Marine Shells of South Africa. An Illustrated Collector’s Guide to Beached Shells. Ekogilde Publishers, Hartebeespoort, South Africa, ii + 264 pp. page(s): 154

External links
  Tucker, J.K. 2004 Catalog of recent and fossil turrids (Mollusca: Gastropoda). Zootaxa 682:1–1295.
 
 Specimen at MNHN, Paris

rousi
Gastropods described in 1886